Elizabeth Nyström (19 March 1942 – 16 February 2016) was a Swedish Moderate Party politician.

She served as a member of the Riksdag from the constituency Västra Götaland County North from 1996 to 2006.

Early life
Nyström's father was a keen auto rally driver, and the 1960s she was map reader first for her father, and eventually for rally driver Pat Moss.

References

1942 births
2016 deaths
Members of the Riksdag from the Moderate Party
Women members of the Riksdag
Members of the Riksdag 1994–1998
Members of the Riksdag 1998–2002
21st-century Swedish women politicians
20th-century Swedish women politicians
20th-century Swedish politicians